Lake Lupche is a small lake on the Kola Peninsula, Murmansk Oblast, Russia near Kandalaksha. It has an elevation of 23.1 m. Lupche-Savino River flows from the lake.

References 

Lupche-Savino
Lupche-Savino basin